Rajya Sabha elections were held in 1966, to elect members of the Rajya Sabha, Indian Parliament's upper chamber.

Elections
Elections were held in 1966 to elect members from various states.
The list is incomplete.

Members elected
The following members are elected in the elections held in 1966. They are members for the term 1966-72 and retire in year 1972, except in case of the resignation or death before the term.

State - Member - Party

Bye-elections
The following bye elections were held in the year 1966.

State - Member - Party

 MP - Chakrapani Shukla - INC (  ele  08/02/1966 term till 1970 )
 Rajasthan - Jagannath_Pahadia - INC (  ele  22/03/1966 term till 1970 )23/02/1967
 Nominated - M N Kaul - NOM ( ele  30/03/1966 term till 1970 )
 Uttar Pradesh  - Tarkeshwar Pande  - INC ( ele  30/07/1966 term till 1970 )
 Haryana - Krishna Kant   - INC (  ele  29/11/1966 term till 1972 )
 Haryana - Ram Chander  - INC (  ele  29/11/1966 term till 1968 )

References

1966 elections in India
1966